SK Roudnice nad Labem is a Czech football club located in Roudnice nad Labem in the Ústí nad Labem Region. It currently plays in the Okresní přebor – Litoměřice, which is in the eighth tier of Czech football. Since 2011, Roudnice has been a farm team for Czech First League side FK Teplice.

The club was promoted to the Bohemian Football League in 2011 after finishing second in Divize B in the Czech Fourth Division. Champions SK Viktorie Jirny decided not to promote.

Current squad

References

External links
 Official website 

Football clubs in the Czech Republic
Association football clubs established in 1907
Litoměřice District